Morgari is a surname. Notable people with the surname include:

Beatrice Morgari (1858–1936), Italian painter
Luigi Morgari (1857–1935), Italian painter
Oddino Morgari (1865–1944), Italian journalist and politician
Paolo Emilio Morgari (1815–1882), Italian painter
Pietro Morgari (1852–1885), Italian painter
Rodolfo Morgari (1827–1909), Italian painter